Melica eligulata is a species of grass in the family Poaceae. It is native to Afghanistan, Iran, Iraq, Lebanon, Syria, and Turkey.

Description
The species is perennial and is caespitose as well. The leaf-sheaths are smooth, tubular and have one closed end. Both leaf-sheaths and leaf-blades have glabrous surface. The main panicle branches are ascending and are divided.

Both the upper and lower glumes are oblong, keelless, and are membranous. It palea is 2-veined.

Flowers are fleshy, oblong, truncate, have 2 lodicules and grow together. They have 3 anthers with fruits that are caryopses. The fruit also have additional pericarp with a linear hilum.

Ecology

References

eligulata
Flora of Asia
Flora of Afghanistan
Flora of Iran
Flora of Iraq
Flora of Lebanon
Flora of Syria
Flora of Turkey
Taxa named by Pierre Edmond Boissier